The  is an electric multiple unit (EMU) train type operated by the private railway operator Shin-Keisei Electric Railway on the Shin-Keisei Line in Chiba Prefecture, Japan, since September 1993.

Formations
, the fleet consists of three eight-car sets based at Kunugiyama Depot with four motored (M) cars and four trailer (T) cars, formed as shown below, with the Tc1 car at the Tsudanuma end.

 The M2 cars are each fitted with two single-arm-type pantographs.
 The T1 cars are designated as having mild air-conditioning.

History
The sets were built by Nippon Sharyo in Aichi Prefecture, with the first set entering service on 26 September 1993. The second set entered service on 29 February 1996, and the third set entered service on 25 June 1996.

In 2014, set 8911 was reduced to six cars and repainted in the new pink corporate colour scheme.

References

External links

 Official Shin-Keisei rolling stock information 
 Shin-Keisei 8900 series (Nippon Sharyo) 

Electric multiple units of Japan
Train-related introductions in 1993
1500 V DC multiple units of Japan
Nippon Sharyo multiple units